Jugaste y Sufri is a song by Eslabon Armado featuring DannyLux. It was released from the Band's 3rd Studio Album "Corta Venas" by DEL Records on December 18, 2020. The song debuted number 69 in the Billboard US Hot 100 and number 3 in the Billboard Hot Latin Songs Chart.

References 

2020 singles
Regional Mexican songs